Anshuman Tiwari (born 25 March 1974) is an Indian journalist.

Life and career
Anshuman Tiwari was born on 25 March 1974 in Uttar Pradesh, India. He graduated with a Bachelor of Arts in Hindi/English literature, Geography in 1988 from Kannauj, Uttar Pradesh, and got a master's degree as Master of Arts (double), Geography and Hindi Literature  from Kanpur, Uttar Pradesh in 1990 with a professional degree in Master's Diploma in Mass communication and Journalism  in 1991 from Bharatiya Vidya Bhavan, Kanpur.

He worked at Dainik Jagran in various positions and was its chief of national bureau. He led Money Bhaskar (Hindi economic content vertical of to DB Corp) as an editor and Vertical Head.

He started his career as stock market correspondent at Kanpur in the early 90s. He covered various economic ministries and reported on macroeconomic, trade and financial markets.

He investigated Delhi CWG Commonwealth Games 2012 for a three years long exposé as the chief of National Bureau of Dainik Jagran.

He initiated, planned and executed the digital transition of Dainik Jagran.

Prior to his current appointment, he worked at India Today (Hindi) as editor.

Since October 2021, he has been employed as editor of Money9, part of the TV9 Network, after having worked six years at India Today.

Honours, awards and accolades
 Recipient of Ramnath Goenka Award for investigative journalism
 Rashtriya Arthik Hindi Patrakarita Purskar 2007 Banaras Beads limited Varanasi National award for Economic Journalism in Hindi

Publications

 Research paper on the conundrum of online comments, How to get most out of wise crowd, from University of Westminster under Chevening Fellowship 
 Paper – Economic Impact of Terror on South Asia
 Paper on India and China relations published from ISAS Singapore; profile carried in the collection of seminal papers

Books

References

Living people
1974 births
Journalists from Uttar Pradesh